Valeria Katharina Kleiner (born 27 March 1991) is a German football player who plays as defender for Bayer Leverkusen in the Women Bundesliga and for the Germany Women's National U-20.

Career

Club career
Valeria Kleiner began playing football at TSV Oberreitnau in 1998. Later on she played for FC Wangen and VfB Friedrichshafen.

In 2007, she joined SC Freiburg and she made her first appearance in the match against FC Saarbrücken becoming the youngest player to play for SC Freiburg in Bundesliga.

She joined 1. FFC Frankfurt in 2010/11 and 2011/12 football season.

On 9 August 2013, she signed a contract with Bayern Munich.

International career
In October 2008, Kleiner won her first call up to the Germany Women's National Under-17. In May 2008 she began the captain of the team and Germany won the Uefa Women's Under-17 Championship in Nyon. In the same tournament she was named in the UEFA top 11 team.

In November 2008, she was part of the Germany Women's National Under-19 that reached the third place in the 2008 FIFA U-17 Women's World Cup.
In 2010, after the UEFA Women's U-19 Championship, UEFA named her in the top 10 players list.

In June 2010, Kleiner was named in the Germany Women's National U-20 Team by the trainer Maren Meinert to take part in the 2010 FIFA U-20 Women's World Cup in Germany.

Honours
National team
FIFA U-20 Women's World Cup: Winner 2010
FIFA U-17 Women's World Cup: Third Place 2008 
UEFA Women's Under-17 Championship Winner 2008
DFB-Pokal: Winner 2011

Individual
Bronze Fritz-Walter Medal 2008

References

External links
 Official Website of Valeria Kleiner
 Framba.de profile
 Valeria Kleiner Profile in Germany U-20 Team

1991 births
Living people
Bayer 04 Leverkusen (women) players
FC Bayern Munich (women) players
1. FFC Frankfurt players
German women's footballers
Women's association football defenders
People from Lindau
Sportspeople from Swabia (Bavaria)
Footballers from Bavaria